J.J. Starbuck is an American crime drama television series that aired on NBC from September 26, 1987, to June 28, 1988. The series follows cornpone-spouting Jerome Jeremiah "J.J." Starbuck, a billionaire Texan who wears ten-gallon hats, cowboy boots and fancy western shirts. He drives a flashy limousine with steer horns on the hood and a horn that plays "The Eyes of Texas", and spouts a steady stream of folksy homilies.

Overview
J.J. Starbuck was an ostentatious self-made Texas billionaire who earned his fortune in oil and a variety of other investment ventures.  Unfortunately, J.J.'s work had become his life, at the expense of his family.  Then, one day his wife Lee and son Mark decided to pay J.J. a surprise visit aboard an off-shore oil rig he was working when their plane crashed en route and both were killed.  Only then did J.J. realize that the two most valuable assets in his life were lost and no amount of money could ever buy them back.  From that day on, J.J. Starbuck became a changed man.  He turned day-to-day control of his company, Marklee Enterprises, over to his trusted second, Charlie Bullets (played by character actor David Huddleston in the pilot, and singer Jimmy Dean thereafter), and hit the open road in his 1961 Lincoln Convertible to see to it that others didn't make the same mistakes he did.  He traveled the country helping out "good folks" in trouble using his considerable influence and contacts, and more than a little detective work.

For most of the program's one-season run, J.J. was basically a loner.  Then, during a break in production late in the fall of 1987, star Dale Robertson was at home on his ranch in Oklahoma when he took a tumble from a horse and injured his hip and leg.  The injury was written into the series and J.J. picked up a new driver and traveling companion in the process.  Actor/entertainer Ben Vereen reprised his character E.L. "Tenspeed" Turner from the 1980 short-lived ABC detective series Tenspeed and Brown Shoe to fill the role.   Straight-arrow J.J. and con-artist E.L. were a mismatched pair, but they were beginning to grow on each other.  NBC bounced the series between Tuesday and Saturday nights before cancelling it after 16 episodes. The show ranked  48th for the season with an average 13.3 rating.

Cast
 Dale Robertson as Jerome Jeremiah "J.J." Starbuck
 Shawn Weatherly as Jill Starbuck
 Jimmy Dean as Charlie Bullets
 Ben Vereen as E.L. "Tenspeed" Turner

Episodes

References

External links

NBC original programming
Television series by 20th Century Fox Television
Television series by Stephen J. Cannell Productions
1987 American television series debuts
1988 American television series endings
1980s American crime drama television series
English-language television shows
Television shows set in Texas
Television series created by Stephen J. Cannell